XHLOS-FM (97.7 FM) is a radio station in Montemorelos, Nuevo León, known as Vive FM. XHLOS is part of the Nuevo León state-owned Radio Nuevo León public network.

References

Radio stations in Nuevo León